Raynor Alan Francis Barron (1 November 1940 – 13 February 2016) was a British actor. He typically played minor roles such as policemen or workmen. He was known for his work in films such as 10 Rillington Place (1971) in which he played a workman, Poor Cow (1967), She'll Follow You Anywhere (1971) and Cry Uncle! (1971). In 1976 he appeared in Doctor Who as Sergeant Henderson in parts five and six of the serial The Seeds of Doom, and in 1981 played a seaman in the series The Incredible Mr Tanner.

In 2008, Ray was the special guest at a 43tv Retro TV Sweeney Meet in Hammersmith, London. Ray gave an after dinner talk about his career in television and film, and in particular his part in The Sweeney.

Filmography

References

External links
 

20th-century British male actors
British male film actors
British male television actors
1940 births
2016 deaths